
miR-150 is a family of microRNA precursors found in mammals, including humans. The ~22 nucleotide mature miRNA sequence is excised from the precursor hairpin by the enzyme Dicer. This sequence then associates with RISC which effects RNA interference.

miR-150 functions in hematopoiesis; it regulates genes whose downstream products encourage differentiating stem cells towards becoming megakaryocytes rather than erythrocytes. It is also thought to control B and T cell differentiation, alongside mir-155.

Role in cancer
miR-150 has been linked with a number of cancers. It is thought to promote cancer cell proliferation in gastric cancer and has also been found to be more than 50x overexpressed in osteosarcoma.

Applications
miR-150 levels in blood plasma can be indicative of early sepsis; it could have a future use therapeutically in treating the condition. In addition, miR-150 is one of a number of microRNAs whose expression profile could be used as a biomarker of hepatocellular carcinoma.

References

Further reading 

 
 

MicroRNA